Vinod Rai (born 23 May 1948) is a former IAS officer who served as the 11th Comptroller and Auditor General of India. He assumed office on 7 January 2008 till 22 May 2013. He is the current chairman of UN Panel of External Auditors and Honorary Advisor to the Indian Railways and a member of the Railway Kaya Kalp Council.

The trial of 2G allocation accused led to the court passing the judgement that not a single piece of admissible evidence existed against the accused.
Rai was made the chairman of the Banking Board of India under the new government. On 30 January 2017, the Supreme Court of India appointed Rai as the interim president of the Board of Control for Cricket in India (BCCI). He is the head of advisory commission of Kerala Infrastructure and Investment Board (KIIFB), appointed by Government of Kerala.

Early life and education
He was born in a Bhumihar family at Ghazipur, Uttar Pradesh. He did his schooling from Birla Public School in Pilani, Rajasthan. He graduated from Hindu College, University of Delhi. He has a bachelor's and master's degree in economics from Delhi School of Economics, University of Delhi and MPA from Harvard University, USA in 1988. He chose to study Financial Administration at Harvard Kennedy school in 1987 while he held the position of District Collector and Magistrate in the state of Kerala, India.

He is married and has three children.

Career
Rai is a 1972 batch Kerala cadre officer of Indian Administrative Service (IAS). He started his career as the sub-collector of Thrissur District. Later, he became the Collector and spent his eight years of career in Thrissur City. He was called the second Sakthan Thampuran for his role in the development of the Thrissur City.  He was the MD of Kerala State Co-operative Marketing Federation from 1977 to 1980. Later he was appointed as Principal Secretary (Finance) in the State Government of Kerala. He had served senior positions in the Ministries of Commerce and Defence, Government of India. Prior to his appointment as CAG, he served as Secretary, Financial Services and Additional Secretary in the Banking Division including banks and insurance companies under Ministry of Finance.

Rai was instrumental in setting up the India Infrastructure Finance Company and was also on the Board of this company. Apart from serving in both, state and union governments, he has been a director on several Boards, including the State Bank of India, ICICI Bank, IDBI Bank, Life Insurance Corporation of India and Infrastructure Development and Finance Company of India.

In February 2016, Rai was appointed the chairman of Banks Board Bureau (BBB), the body which advises the government on top-level appointments at public sector banks and ways to address the bad loans.

United Nations Panel of External Auditors
He is the chairman of United Nations Panel of External Auditors  and member of the Governing Board of the International Organization of Supreme Audit Institutions (INTOSAI). The United Nations Secretary-General Ban Ki Moon has appreciated the panel and the yeoman service rendered by the external auditors in improving governance in the United Nations system. The panel headed by Vinod Rai discussed the major business transformations currently under way in the United Nations with Secretary-General Ban Ki Moon. The Panel of External Auditors plays an important role in promoting accountability and strengthening governance mechanisms in the UN organisations. Mr. Rai has taken over as the chairman of Governing Board of the Asian Organization of Supreme Audit Institutions (ASOSAI) on 29 February 2012.

CAG of India
Forbes described Rai as being among that rare breed of civil servants who knows how to get work done in the government. A former colleague says Rai has an uncanny ability to cut through red tape.
He was appointed as Comptroller and Auditor General of India with the backing of finance minister P. Chidambaram.
But he has served up uncomfortable audit reports that have pinned many government departments beyond the baseline.

He has consistently hit the headlines for his unforgiving audits, ranging from the scathing report on the shoddy preparation for the Commonwealth Games to the latest on spectrum allocations for second generation (2G) telecom services.

Along with a vibrant media, an activist Supreme Court and an increasingly vociferous civil society, his supporters say, Rai has made his office into a powerful force for accountability and transparency in modern India.

BCCI chief

 The Supreme Court nominated a four-member panel to look after the administration of the BCCI.
 Former CAG Vinod Rai, historian Ramachandra Guha, banker Vikaram Limaye and former captain of women's cricket team Diana Edulji were to look after the BCCI's administration until formal elections were held.

Reforms suggested by Vinod Rai
Vinod Rai recommended that all private-public partnerships (PPPs), "Panchayti Raj Institutions" and societies benefiting from government funds should come within the ambit of the CAG. The PPP model is a popular medium for the execution of infrastructure projects worth millions of rupees, and these projects are not audited by the CAG. 60 percent of government spending does not currently come under the scrutiny of the CAG.

Major audits

2G Spectrum allocation

He is widely credited for the report on issue of Licences and Allocation of 2G Spectrum by United Progressive Alliance government which resulted in a huge controversy in India. In a chargesheet filed on 2 April 2011 by the investigating agency Central Bureau of Investigation (CBI), the agency pegged the loss at 

On 2 February 2012 the Supreme Court of India on a public interest litigation (PIL) declared allotment of spectrum as "unconstitutional and arbitrary" and quashed all the 122 licenses issued in 2008 during tenure of A. Raja (then minister for communications & IT in United Progressive Alliance) the main accused. The court further said that A. Raja "wanted to favour some companies at the cost of the public exchequer" and "virtually gifted away important national asset".

However, the Presumptive Revenue loss calculation has never been established and has at best remained a conjecture. On 3 August 2012 when according to the directions of the Supreme Court, the Government of India revised the spectrum price to Rs 140 billion as reserve price for 2G spectrum and decided to sell airwaves in Delhi, Mumbai, Karnataka and Rajasthan for 1800 MHz band, and pan India for the 800 MHz band the response was poor, to say the least. The Government then announced that it would auction the unsold spectrum in the 1800 MHz band from the 2012 spectrum auction, immediately after the first round, which began on 11 March, got over to comply with a Supreme Court order. The government also reduced the reserve price for 1800 MHz by 30% and for 800 MHz by 50% from the 2012 spectrum auction. Response to the 2013 spectrum auction was also very poor. While there were no bidders for spectrum in 1800 MHz and 900 MHz bands, MTS India was the only bidder for airwaves in 800 MHz band. Airtel and Idea were reluctant to participate in the spectrum auction for due to steep pricing of the auction.

The main criticism to the report now emerging is that the CAG exceeded its constitutional mandate as it attempted in a sense to change the policy of the Government of India which at that point was to promote telecom growth and not revenue maximisation by arguing that spectrum could only be sold by auction and creating figures for Presumtive losses around it. However, the Honble Supreme Court Of India in the Presidential Reference (2012) has upheld the right of the Government to frame policy and said "The norm of 'common good' has to be understood and appreciated in a holistic manner. The manner in which the common good is best subserved is not a matter that can be measured by any constitutional yardstick — it depends on the economic and political philosophy of the government. Revenue maximization is not the only way in which the common good can be subserved. Where revenue maximization is the object of a policy, being considered qua that resource at that point of time to be the best way to subserve the common good, auction would be one of the preferable methods, though not the only method. Where revenue maximization is not the object of a policy of distribution, the question of auction would not arise. Revenue considerations may assume secondary consideration to developmental considerations."
A.Raja is set free by CBI trial court and CBI went for review petition in Delhi High court, case is under trial now.

In 2014, Rai named Sanjay Nirupam as one of the MPs who pressured him to leave former prime minister Dr. Manmohan Singh out of the report. Nirupam filed a defamation case against Rai in the Metropolitan Court in New Delhi’s Patiala house. In October 2021, he tendered unconditional apology to Mr. Sanjay Nirupam for the false accusations. In a written affidavit Rai said: “That I have realised that in answer to questions posed to me by the interviewers, I had inadvertently and wrongly mentioned the name of Sanjay Nirupam as one of the MPs who pressurised me to keep the then Prime Minister Manmohan Singh’s name out of the CAG report on 2G spectrum allocation during the meetings in the PAC or the sidelines of JPC.”

CoalGate (coal mines allocation)

Delhi Commonwealth Games 2010

Padmanabhaswamy Temple Audit
Based on the recommendations by amicus curiae-senior advocate Gopal Subramaniam who was investigating the issues of financial irregularities and mismanagement in the Padmanabhaswamy Temple, the Supreme Court of India issued an interim order on 24 April 2014 stating that Mr Vinod Rai will supervise special audit of property of temple. Rai responded by saying that he felt "very humbled" and said "With all sincerity I will take up the task".

Confrontation with Governments

As a part of his duty, Rai has many a times raised questions on faulty policy making of several state governments and Union government run by Congress led United Progressive Alliance and BJP led Governments in Chhattisgarh and Gujarat. He had slammed the Union government in the allocation of spectrum for 2G mobile use to telecom operators, conduct of the 2010 Commonwealth Games, running of its flagship rural employment guarantee scheme and the spending by Reliance Industries in KG D6 oil block. He had also pointed out improprieties in allocating coal blocks, and Union government's overt generosity to GMR in an airport project and Reliance Power in Sasan ultra mega power plant. CAG slammed the government of Goa for forest policy delay, and the Haryana government for loss of over  due to "deficiency" in imposing taxes like sales tax on goods, stamp duty and registration fee in land deals and taxes on vehicles in more than 4,000 cases in a year.

There are certain times when ministers of ruling Congress coalition government criticised CAG. Minister of state in PMO, V. Narayanasamy said "CAG has no authority or right to comment on the policy of the government but unfortunately it has questioned its authority, which is totally unwarranted and against the mandate given to them". However CAG Vinod Rai defended his position by stating at an Economic Editor's Conference in 2011 "I am making it clear that I do not think the CAG is exceeding its jurisdiction, because the basic responsibility of the CAG is to identify if there is any lapse," and challenged the government to identify the specific breach of mandate.

Published book
He wrote Not Just an Accountant: The Diary of the Nations Conscience Keeper, which speaks about how the political system was exploited to violate laws in 2G spectrum case, Krishna-Godavari gas basin contract, Commonwealth Games scam, Indian coal allocation scam and the controversial purchase of aircraft.

Awards and recognition

He figured as one of the Persons of the Year in Forbes magazine in January 2011.

In December 2011, he was chosen as the chief of UN external audit panel.

In February 2012, CAG was complimented for professionalism, training and infrastructure by its US counterpart.

References

External links 

Living people
Comptrollers in India
People from Ghazipur
Harvard Kennedy School alumni
1948 births
Recipients of the Padma Bhushan in civil service
Indian Administrative Service officers